Terhune Run is a tributary of Lawrence Brook in eastern South Brunswick, New Jersey in the United States.

Course

Accessibility
Terhune Run is short, crossing one road, making it hard to access.

Sister tributaries
Beaverdam Brook
Great Ditch
Ireland Brook
Oakeys Brook
Sawmill Brook
Sucker Brook
Unnamed Brook in Rutgers Gardens, unofficially named Doc Brook
Unnamed Brook in Rutgers' Helyar Woods

See also
List of rivers of New Jersey

References

Tributaries of the Raritan River
Rivers of Middlesex County, New Jersey
Rivers of New Jersey